Tungatarovo (Tuñğatar) is a rural locality (a selo) in Tungatarovsky Selsoviet, Uchalinsky District, Bashkortostan, Russia. The population was 504 as of 2010. There are 5 streets.

Geography 
Tungatarovo is located 43 km northeast of Uchaly (the district's administrative centre) by road. Komsomolsk is the nearest rural locality.

References 

Rural localities in Uchalinsky District